The Krustpils–Rēzekne II Railway is a  long,  gauge railway built in the 20th century to connect Krustpils and Rēzekne as part of the international Ventspils–Moscow Railway.

References 

Railway lines in Latvia
Railway lines opened in 1901
1900s establishments in Latvia
5 ft gauge railways in Latvia